Vesser is a river of Thuringia, Germany. It flows into the Breitenbach in the village Breitenbach.

See also

List of rivers of Thuringia

Rivers of Thuringia
Rivers of Germany